Karol L. Zachar (12 January 1918 in Svätý Anton – 17 December 2003 in Bratislava), born Karol Legény, was a Slovak director, actor, art director, costume designer and pedagogue. Performer of many characteristic and comedian Slovak and world classics roles, including works of Ivan Stodola, Jozef Gregor-Tajovský, Molière, Alexander Ostrovsky, Aleksander Fredro.

Selected filmography
 St. Peter's Umbrella (1958)

References

External links
 

1918 births
2003 deaths
People from Banská Štiavnica District
Art directors
Costume designers
20th-century Slovak male actors
Slovak male film actors
Slovak male television actors